The Assistance Formation is a geologic formation located on Devon Island and Ellesmere Island in Nunavut. It preserves fossils dating back to the Permian period. The formation rides along the southeastern edges of the Sverdrup Basin, as well as on Melville Island and Grinnell Peninsula

Discovery
The Assistance Formation was discovered in 1955 by Raymond Thorsteinsson, during Operation Franklin. Although the Trold Fiord Formation and Degerbols Formation were generally recognized as part of the Assistance Formation, Thorsteinsson clarified various terminology problems and cleared any naming discontinuities.

Lithology
Fine grained, green/gray sandstone and mudstone compose a large part of the formation. The lower portions and beds of the stone are generally recessive, with and occur in beds up to .6 meters in length and depth. Outside of sandstone and rust-colored rocks, the loose components of the fiord usually include limestone and a plethora of perpetually-eroding organic debris. In the upper half of the formation, oxidized, calcareous ironstone buildups remain abundant. On Melville Island and Grinnell Peninsula, the depth of the fiord is usually its lowest, averaging around 60 meters. The thickest parts of the fiord occur on Ellesmere Island.

See also

 List of fossiliferous stratigraphic units in Nunavut

References
 
 Nassichuk, Walter & Hodgkinson, Kenneth. (1976). Scaphopods from the Permian Assistance Formation, Canadian Arctic Archipelago. Journal of Paleontology. 50. 1150–1156. 
 Nassichuk, W. W. "Assistance Formation." Weblex Canada, Weblex, 6 Mar. 2009, weblex.nrcan.gc.ca/html/000000/GSCC00053000522.html.

Permian Nunavut
Permian northern paleotemperate deposits